Penglai Pier-2 is a light rail station of the Circular Line of the Kaohsiung rapid transit system. It is located in Yancheng District, Kaohsiung, Taiwan.

Station overview
The station is a street-level station with two side platforms. It is located inside Pier-2 Art Center.

Station layout

Around the station
 Pier-2 Art Center
 Penglai Area of The Pier-2 Art Center
 Hamasen Museum of Taiwan Railway
 Kaohsiung Harbor Museum
 Kaohsiung Experimental Theater
 Kaohsiung Harbor No.2 Wharf
 Arch of Kaohsiung Port
 Yanchengpu Night Market

References

2015 establishments in Taiwan
Railway stations opened in 2015
Circular light rail stations